Thomas Mxolisi Kaunda (born 13 September 1972) is a South African politician from KwaZulu-Natal serving as the Mayor of the eThekwini Metropolitan Municipality since 2019. He was the KwaZulu-Natal MEC for Transport, Community Safety and Liaison from 2016 to 2019 and a member of the KwaZulu-Natal Legislature from 2009 to 2019. Kaunda is a member of the ruling African National Congress (ANC).

Early life and education
Kaunda was born on 13 September 1972, in the town of Inanda outside Durban in the Natal Province. He became involved in politics at the age of fifteen, as he joined the Congress of South African Students (COSAS). He matriculated from Intshisekelo High School and then went on to study at the University of South Africa, where he achieved a Diploma in Governance and Leadership. He later studied at the University of the Witwatersrand and obtained an Advanced Diploma in Advanced Governance and Public Leadership.

Political career
In 2000, Kaunda was elected as a ward councillor of the newly established eThekwini Metropolitan Municipality, a position he held until the 2006 municipal election when he became a PR councillor of the municipality. He served on the municipal Economic Development and Markets Sub-Committee.

He was deployed to the KwaZulu-Natal Legislature following the 2009 general election. In his first term as an MPL, he served as Chairperson of the Transport Portfolio Committee. He was a member of the Finance, Community Safety and Liaison committees. Kaunda was also an alternate member of the Co-Operative Governance and Traditional Affairs committees.

Following his re-election in 2014, he remained Chairperson of the Transport Committee and became a member of the legislature's Economic Development, Tourism and Environmental Affairs, and Community Safety and Liaison committees.

In June 2016, newly elected Premier Willies Mchunu appointed Kaunda as the MEC for Transport, Community Safety and Liaison. Sihle Zikalala was elected Premier in May 2019, and he retained Kaunda in his post.

In addition to holding public office, Kaunda has also held multiple ANC party leadership positions. He was elected to the post of ANCYL Provincial Secretary in 2004 and served until 2008 when he was appointed ANCYL Provincial Chairperson, a post he held until 2010. He has been a member of the ANC's Provincial Executive Committee (PEC) since 2012. Kaunda is also a Provincial Working Committee (PWC) member.

Mayor of eThekwini (2019–present)
In August 2019, after months of legal challenges and infighting controversies, the ANC KwaZulu-Natal branch officially recalled Zandile Gumede as Mayor of eThekwini on 13 August 2019. Kaunda was seen as one of three frontrunners for the post alongside Nomusa Dube-Ncube and Nhlanhla Ngidi. Kaunda was ultimately selected for the post on 22 August 2019. Gumede tendered her resignation as mayor on 26 August 2019, but withdrew it on 29 August 2019. This move from Gumede resulted in the monthly council sitting, which was supposed to elect new leadership, being delayed. Gumede officially resigned on 3 September 2019. Kaunda was elected Mayor of eThekwini on 5 September 2019.

References

External links
Thomas Mxolisi Kaunda at People's Assembly
Thomas Mxolisi Kaunda, Mr – South African Government

1972 births
Living people
Zulu people
University of South Africa alumni
University of the Witwatersrand alumni
People from Inanda, KwaZulu-Natal
African National Congress politicians
Members of the KwaZulu-Natal Legislature
Mayors of Durban